Northern Lights Casino, is a casino located in Prince Albert, Saskatchewan, Canada. The  facility includes a Casino (with 590 slot machines, 11 table games), lounge, and restaurant opened in 1996.

The Casino opened a new  expansion in January, 2011 that included a smoking room, and 203 slot machines.

See also
 List of casinos in Canada

References

External links 
 Casino Web Page

Casinos in Saskatchewan
Buildings and structures in Prince Albert, Saskatchewan
Music venues in Saskatchewan
Tourist attractions in Prince Albert, Saskatchewan
Casinos completed in 1996